White Rose is a 1919 Hungarian silent drama film directed by Alexander Korda and starring María Corda, Gyula Bartos, and Emil Fenyvessy. It was based on an 1853 novel by Mór Jókai. It was released by the state-owned Hungarian film industry during the Hungarian Soviet Republic, although production had begun before the regime came to power. Korda went on to make two further films for the Soviet government Yamata and Ave Caesar! which led to his eventual arrest once the regime had been overthrown and his ultimate decision to leave Hungary for Austria.

Cast

References

Bibliography

External links
 

1919 films
Hungarian silent films
Hungarian drama films
1910s Hungarian-language films
Films directed by Alexander Korda
Films based on Hungarian novels
Films of the Hungarian Soviet Republic
Soviet silent films
Soviet drama films
Soviet black-and-white films
Hungarian black-and-white films
1919 drama films
Silent drama films